In the mathematical theory of probability, the voter model is an interacting particle system introduced by Richard A. Holley and Thomas M. Liggett in 1975.

One can imagine that there is a "voter" at each point on a connected graph, where the connections indicate that there is some form of interaction between a pair of voters (nodes). The opinions of any given voter on some issue changes at random times under the influence of opinions of his neighbours. A voter's opinion at any given time can take one of two values, labelled 0 and 1. At random times, a random individual is selected and that voter's opinion is changed according to a stochastic rule. Specifically, for one of the chosen voter's neighbors is chosen according to a given set of probabilities and that individual's opinion is transferred to the chosen voter.

An alternative interpretation is in terms of spatial conflict. Suppose two nations control the areas (sets of nodes) labelled 0 or 1. A flip from 0 to 1 at a given location indicates an invasion of that site by the other nation.

Note that only one flip happens each time. Problems involving the voter model will often be recast in terms of the dual system of coalescing Markov chains. Frequently, these problems will then be reduced to others involving independent Markov chains.

Definition

Each component  is called a configuration. To make it clear that  stands for the value of a site x in configuration ; while  means the value of a site x in configuration  at time .

The dynamic of the process are specified by the collection of transition rates. It has the following properties:

  for every  if  or if 
  for every  if  for all 
  if  and 
  is invariant under shifts in 

(2) indicates that the evolution is unchanged by interchanging the roles of 0's and 1's. In property (3),  means , and  implies  if , and implies  if .

Clustering and coexistence
The interest in is the limiting behavior of the models. Since the flip rates of a site depends on its neighbours, it is obvious that when all sites take the same value, the whole system stops changing forever. The main question to be discussed is whether or not there are others, which would then represent coexistence of different opinions in equilibrium. It is said coexistence occurs if there is a stationary distribution that concentrates on configurations with infinitely many 0's and 1's. On the other hand, if for all  and all initial configurations, then

It is said that clustering occurs.

It is important to distinguish clustering with the concept of cluster.

The linear voter model

Model description
This section will be dedicated to one of the basic voter models, the Linear Voter Model.

Then in Linear voter model, the transition rates are linear functions of :

A process of coalescing random walks  is defined as follows. Here  denotes the set of sites occupied by these random walks at time . At that time, the two that meet coalesce into one particle, which continues to move like a random walk with transition probabilities  •,• .

The concept of Duality is essential for analysing the behavior of the voter models. The linear voter models satisfy a very useful form of duality, known as coalescing duality, which is:

Limiting behaviors of linear voter models

Therefore, the process clusters.

On the other hand, when  , the system coexists.

for some constant  corresponding to the initial distribution.

If  be a symmetrized random walk, then there are the following theorems:

Theorem 2.1

The linear voter model  clusters if  is recurrent, and coexists if  is transient. In particular,

 the process coexists if .

Remarks: To contrast this with the behavior of the threshold voter models that will be discussed in next section, note that whether the linear voter model clusters or coexists depends almost exclusively on the dimension of the set of sites, rather than on the size of the range of interaction.

Theorem 2.2
Suppose  is any translation spatially ergodic and invariant probability measure on the state space , then

 If  is recurrent, then ;
 If  is transient, then .

A special linear voter model
One of the interesting special cases of the linear voter model, known as the basic linear voter model, is that for state space :

So that 

In this case, the process clusters if , while coexists if .

Clusters in one dimension d = 1
From Theorem 2.2, thus clustering occurs in this case. The aim of this section is to give a more precise description of this clustering.

provided the limit exists.

Proposition 2.3

Occupation time
Define the occupation time functionals of the basic linear voter model as:

Theorem 2.4

proof

By Chebyshev's inequality and the Borel–Cantelli lemma, there is the equation below:

The theorem follows when letting .

The threshold voter model

Model description
This section, concentrates on a kind of non-linear voter models, known as the threshold voter model. It can always be assumed that  contains all the unit vectors . For a positive integer , the threshold voter model with neighbourhood  and threshold  is the one with rate function:

Simply put, the transition rate of site  is 1 if the number of sites that do not take the same value is larger or equal to the threshold T. Otherwise, site  stays at the current status and will not flip.

Limiting behaviors of threshold voter model
If a threshold voter model does not fixate, the process should be expected to will coexist for small threshold and cluster for large threshold, where large and small are interpreted as being relative to the size of the neighbourhood, . The intuition is that having a small threshold makes it easy for flips to occur, so it is likely that there will be a lot of both 0's and 1's around at all times. The following are three major results:
 If , then the process fixates in the sense that each site flips only finitely often.
 If  with  sufficiently small() and  sufficiently large, then the process coexists.

Here are two theorems corresponding to properties (1) and (2).

Theorem 3.1

If , then the process fixates.

Theorem 3.2

proof

 ,
 the random variables in (b) and (c) are independent of each other,

Once this construction is made, it will follow from renewal theory that

Hence,, so that the process clusters.

Remarks: (a) Threshold models in higher dimensions do not necessarily cluster if . If  is constant on alternating vertical infinite strips, that is for all :

then no transition ever occur, and the process fixates.

(b) Under the assumption of Theorem 3.2, the process does not fixate. To see this, consider the initial configuration , in which infinitely many zeros are followed by infinitely many ones. Then only the zero and one at the boundary can flip, so that the configuration will always look the same except that the boundary will move like a simple symmetric random walk. The fact that this random walk is recurrent implies that every site flips infinitely often.

Property 3 indicates that the threshold voter model is quite different from the linear voter model, in that coexistence occurs even in one dimension, provided that the neighbourhood is not too small. The threshold model has a drift toward the "local minority", which is not present in the linear case.

Most proofs of coexistence for threshold voter models are based on comparisons with hybrid model known as the threshold contact process with parameter .

Proposition 3.3

Model with threshold T = 1

The case that  is of particular interest because it is the only case in which it is known exactly which models coexist and which models cluster.

In particular, there is interest in a kind of Threshold T=1 model with  that is given by:

Theorem 3.4

Suppose that , but .

The proof of this theorem is given in a paper named "Coexistence in threshold voter models" by Thomas M. Liggett.

See also

 Probabilistic Cellular Automata
 sequential dynamical system
 contact process

Notes

References 

 

 
 
 

 Thomas M. Liggett, "Stochastic Interacting Systems: Contact, Voter and Exclusion Processes", Springer-Verlag, 1999.

Stochastic models
Lattice models